Cumbrian is an English dialect spoken in Cumberland, Westmorland and surrounding northern England.

Cumbrian (and the underlying name Cumbria) may refer to:

 Cumbria, a ceremonial and non-metropolitan county in North West England
 Cumbria Coast, a marine conservation zone off the coast of Cumbria
 Cumbria League, the tier-8 rugby union league 
 University of Cumbria
 Cumberland, a historic county of North West England, now part of Cumbria
 Cumbrians, inhabitants of the Kingdom of Strathclyde in the Early Middle Ages
 Prehistoric Cumbria, modern term for the Stone Age to Iron Age (pre-Roman) area that corresponds to modern Cumbria
 Cumbrian (ship), the name of two notable ships

See also

 Cambria (disambiguation), an etymologically related name for Wales, south of Cumbria/Cumberland
 Cambrian (disambiguation)
 Cumbre (disambiguation), a unrelated Spanish word meaning 'peak', found in many place names
 Cumbric, the modern name for a Brittonic language or dialect once spoken in Cumbria and its surrounds
 Cymric (disambiguation), an etymologically related adjective that refers to Wales
 History of Cumbria
 Kombroges or Combrogi (literally 'Compatriots', 'Countrymen'), the name used for themselves by people of Roman Britain native to areas that are now North West England and Wales: see